This is a timeline documenting the events of heavy metal in the year 1985.

Newly formed bands

 Acid Reign
Aftermath
 Agathocles
Alvacast
 Aria
 Attitude Adjustment
 Atrocity
 Banshee
 Blood Feast
 Britny Fox
 Carcass
 Chakal
China
Cry Wolf
Dare
 David Lee Roth
 Defiance
 Deliverance
Diamond Rexx
Doom
 Dream Theater (under the name "Majesty")
Drivin N Cryin
Eternity X
 Executer
 Exhorder
 Extreme
 Extreme Noise Terror
 Exumer
 Faster Pussycat
 Fate
 Forbidden
 Fu Manchu
  Goatlord
Gore
 Guns N' Roses
 Holocausto	
 Hunter
 Jane's Addiction
 Juggernaut

 King Diamond
 L7
 Loudblast
Love/Hate
 Macabre
 Meanstreak
 Mekong Delta
 Morgoth
 Mortal Sin
 Mr. Bungle
 Mutilator
 Neurosis
 Osmi Putnik
 Pentagram Chile
 Poltergeist
 Rata Blanca
 Sabbat
 Sacred Oath
 Sacred Reich
 Sadistik Exekution
 Sanctuary
 Sarcófago
 Satanic Slaughter
Screaming Trees
Sea Hags
 Shadow Gallery
Shotgun Messiah
Skin Yard
 Stone
 Stormtroopers of Death
 Tarot (under the name "Purgatory" until record deal)
Thee Hypnotics
Tora Tora
 Tormentor
 Toxik
Tuff
 Vio-lence
 Viper
White Tiger
 White Zombie
Whitecross
Zodiac Mindwarp and the Love Reaction

Albums & EPs

 Lee Aaron - Call of the Wild
 Abattoir - Vicious Attack
 AC/DC - Fly on the Wall
 Accept - Metal Heart
 Acid – Engine Beast
 ADX - Exécution
 Aerosmith - Done with Mirrors
 Agent Steel - Skeptics Apocalypse
 Agent Steel - Mad Locust Rising (EP)
 Alcatrazz - Disturbing the Peace
 Alien Force - Hell And High Water
 Angel Witch - Screamin' 'n' Bleedin'
 Anthem - Anthem
 Anthem - Ready to Ride (EP)
 Anthrax - Armed and Dangerous (EP)
 Anthrax - Spreading the Disease
 Anvil - Backwaxed (comp)
 April Wine - Walking Through Fire
 Aria - Mania Velichia
 Armed Force - Heavy Artillery
 Armored Saint - Delirious Nomad
 Artillery - Fear of Tomorrow
 Assassin (PA) - License to Kill
 Astaroth - The Long Loud Silence (EP)
 Atlain - G.O.E.
 Atomkraft - Future Warriors
 Attack - Return of the Evil
 Attacker - Battle at Helm's Deep
 Autograph - That's the Stuff
 Avalanche (MO) - Pray for the Sinner
 Avenger (UK) - Killer Elite
 Avenger (Ger) - Depraved to Black (EP)
 Avenger (Ger) - Prayers of Steel
 Axewitch - Hooked on High Heels
 Axis (OH) - Slightly Tilted
 Axtion – Look Out For The Night
 Bad Lizard – Power of Destruction
 Bad Steve - Killing the Night
 Barón Rojo - En un lugar de la marcha
 Battle Axe - We're on the Attack
 Bathory - The Return……
 Barren Cross - Believe (EP)
 Beast (Ger) - Like Living In A Cage
 Black Angels – Broken Spell
 Black Angels – Black and White
 Black Hole - Land of Mistery
 Black Knight - Master of Disaster (EP)
 BlackLace - Get It While It's Hot
 Blackmayne - Blackmayne
 Black 'n Blue - Without Love
 Black Rose – Nightmare (EP)
 Black Sheep - Trouble in the Streets
 Black Tears - The Slave
 Blaspheme – Désir de Vampyr
 Blessed Death - Kill or Be Killed
 Blind Fury - Out of Reach
 Blind Vengeance – Blind Vengeance
 Blitzkrieg (UK) - A Time of Changes
 Blitzkrieg (US) - Ready for Action (EP)
 Bloodlust - Guilty as Sin
 Bloody Climax - Back to the Wall
 Bloody Mary - Bloody Mary
 Blue Öyster Cult - Club Ninja
 Bon Jovi - 7800° Fahrenheit
 Brainfever – Face to Face
 Breaker - Dead Rider
 Breathless - Breathless
 Bulldozer - The Day of Wrath
 Buster Brown  – Sign of Victory
 Cacumen - Longing for You (EP)
 Carnivore -  Carnivore
 Castle Blak - Babes In Toyland
 Celtic Frost - Emperor's Return (EP)
 Celtic Frost - To Mega Therion
 Chastain - Mystery of Illusion
 Chateaux - Highly Strung 
 Chrome Molly - You Can't Have It All...or Can You?
 Cities - Annihilation Absolute (EP)
 Cobra (UK) – Warriors of the Dead
 Coney Hatch - Friction
 Convict - Go Ahead... Make My Day!
 Corrosion of Conformity - Animosity
 Crack Jaw - Nightout
 Crisis - Kick It Out
 Crossfire - Second Attack
 Crystal Knight - Crystal Knight
 Crying Steel - Crying Steel (EP)
 The Cult - Love
 Cutty Sark - Heroes
 Dagger  – Not Afraid of the Night
 Damien - Face the Danger
 Dark Angel - We Have Arrived
 Dark Lord  – State of Rock (EP) 
 Dark Wizard - Reign of Evil
 Darxon - Tokyo (EP)
 Ded Engine - Ded Engine
 Demon - British Standard Approved
 Demon - Heart of Our Time
 Der Kaiser – La Griffe de L'Empire
 Destiny - Beyond All Sense
 Destruction - Infernal Overkill
 Destructor - Maximum Destruction 
 Devil Childe - Devil Childe
 Dio - Sacred Heart
 Dirty Looks  – Dirty Looks
 Divine Rite - First Rite
 Dokken - Under Lock and Key
 Drysill - Welcome to the Show
 Dungeon - Fortress of Rock 
 Earthshaker - Passion
 E.F. Band - One Night Stand
 Mark Edwards - Code of Honor (EP)
 Electric Sun - Beyond the Astral Skies
 Elysian - Blinded by Sound
 Emerald - Down Town
 Excalibur (UK) – The Bitter End (EP)
 Exciter – Feel the Knife (EP)
 Exciter - Long Live the Loud
 Exodus - Bonded by Blood
 Fact - Without Warning
 Fate - Fate
 Faithful Breath - Skol
 Faith No More - We Care a Lot
 Fastway - Waiting for the Roar
 Fates Warning - The Spectre Within
 Fierce Heart - Fierce Heart
 Fisc - Break Out
 Fist (Can) - Danger Zone
 Flames (Gre) - Made in Hell
 Flatbacker - Accident
 Foreplay -  First Licks
 Fortress - Fortress
 Fortune (band) -  Fortune
 Robin George - Dangerous Music
 Girlschool - Running Wild
 Glacier - Glacier (EP)
 Grave Digger - Witch Hunter
 Gravestone – Back to Attack
 Grim Reaper - Fear No Evil
 Guitar Pete's Axe Attack  – Dead Soldier's Revenge
 Halloween - Don't Metal with Evil
 Hallows Eve - Tales of Terror
 Hammer - Contract with Hell
 Hammerschmitt - Hammerschmitt
 Hammers Rule - After the Bomb (EP)
 Hatrik - The Beast
 Hanover Fist - Hanover Fist
 Hanover Fist - Hungry Eyes
 Joe Hasselvander - Lady Killer
 Haven - Haven (EP)
 Hawaii - The Natives Are Restless
 Headhunter (Swi) - Headhunter
 Headpins - Head over Heels
 Headstone - Excalibur
 Heavy Pettin – Rock Ain't Dead
 Helix - Long Way to Heaven
 Helloïse - Cosmogony
 Helloween - Helloween (EP)
 Helloween - Walls of Jericho
 Herazz - Yet to Come
 High Tension - Warrior
 Highway Chile - Rockarama
 Hirax - Raging Violence
 Holland - Little Monsters
 Horizon - Master of the Game
 Hunter (Ger) - Sign of the Hunter
 Hunter (US) - Hunter
 Icon - Night of the Crime
 Impaler - Rise of the Mutants (EP)
 Iron Angel - Hellish Crossfire
 Iron Cross - Warhead
 Iron Maiden - Live After Death
 Jack Starr's Burning Starr - Rock the American Way 
 Jade – If You're Man Enough
 Jag Wire - Made in Heaven
 Joshua - Surrender
 Karrier - Way Beyond the Night
 Keel - The Right to Rock
 Keen Hue – Ogre King
 Kerber - Ratne igre
 Kick Axe - Welcome to the Club
 Killers (Fra) - Fils de la Haine
 King Kobra - Ready to Strike
 KISS - Asylum
 Kix - Midnite Dynamite
 Knightmare II - Death Do Us Part (EP)
 Kreator - Endless Pain
 Lȧȧz Rockit - No Stranger to Danger
 L.A. - L.A.
 L.A. Guns - Collector's Edition No. 1 (EP)
 Labyrinth - So Wild
 Leatherwolf - Leatherwolf, aka Endangered Species
 Leviticus - The Strob¿ngest Power
 Liege Lord - Freedom's Rise
 Living Death - Metal Revolution
 Living Death - Watch Out! (EP)
 Lions Breed - Damn the Night
 Lizzy Borden - Love You to Pieces
 London - Non-Stop Rock
 Loudness - Thunder in the East
 Lynx - Caught in the Trap
 M-80 - Maniac's Revenge
 Mace (WA) - Process of Elimination
 Mad Butcher - Metal Lightning Attack
 Mad Max - Stormchild
 Magnum - On a Storyteller's Night
 Maineeaxe - Going for Gold
 Maineeaxe - The Hour of Thunder (EP)
 Malice - In the Beginning...
 Mama's Boys - Power and Passion
 Maniac - Maniac
 Manilla Road - Open the Gates
 Martyr - For the Universe
 Mass (MA) - New Birth
 Maxx Warrior - Maxx Warrior (EP)
 Megadeth - Killing Is My Business... And Business Is Good!
 Mercy - Witchburner
 Metal Massacre - Metal Massacre VI (Compilation, various artists)
 Midnight Darkness - Holding the Night
 Mistreater - Mistreater
 Gary Moore - Run for Cover
 Morsüre – Acceleration Process
 Mötley Crüe - Theatre of Pain
 Mournblade - Time's Running Out
 Mox Nix - Mox Nix
 Nasty Savage - Nasty Savage
 Nation (Ger) - Ride On
 Nightmare – Power of the Universe
 Nightwing – A Night of Mystery - Alive! Alive! (live)
 Ninja - The Warriors of Rock
 Obús - Pega con fuerza
 Odin - Don't Take No... For an Answer (EP)
 Omega - The Prophet
 Omen - Warning of Danger
 Overdose - Tight Action
 Overdose - To the Top
 Overkill - Feel the Fire
 Overkill (CA) - Triumph of the Will
 Onslaught - Power from Hell
 Ostrogoth - Too Hot
 Pandemonium - Hole in the Sky
 Paganini - Weapon of Love
 Pantera - I Am the Night
 Paradoxx - Plan of Attak (EP)
 Pentagram - Pentagram, aka Relentless
 Phantom Lord - Phantom Lord
 Phasslayne - Cut It Up
 Philadelphia - Search and Destroy
 Possessed - Seven Churches
 Precious Metal - Right Here, Right Now
 Prophacy - Rock 'n' Roll Nightmare
 Prophet - Prophet
 Rail - III 
 Railway - Railway II
 Ran – Burning
 Ratt - Invasion of Your Privacy
 Raven - Stay Hard
 Razor - Executioner's Song
 Razor - Evil Invaders
 Restless (Ger) - We Rock the Nation
 Kelle Rhoads - Cheap Talkin' Romance (EP)
 Rogue Male - First Visit
 Romeo - Rocks (EP)
 Rosy Vista - You Better Believe It (EP)
 David Lee Roth - Crazy from the Heat (EP)
 Rough Cutt - Rough Cutt
 Ruffians - Ruffians (EP)
 Runestaff – Runestaff
 Running Wild - Branded and Exiled
 Rush - Power Windows
 Sabre (Ger) - Keepers of the Sword
 Sabre (Can) - On the Prowl
 Sacred Few - Beyond the Iron Walls
 Sacred Rite - The Ritual
 Sacrifice (Swi) - On the Altar of Rock
 Sacrilege – Behind the Realms of Madness
 Sadwings - Lonely Hero
 Saigon - One Must Die
 Saints' Anger – Danger Metal
 Saint Vitus - Hallow's Victim
 Satanic Rites - Which Way the Wind Blows
 Savage - Hyperactive
 Savage Grace - Master of Disguise
 Savatage – The Dungeons Are Calling (EP)
 Savatage – Power of the Night
 Saxon - Innocence Is No Excuse
 Scarlet - Phantasm
 Scavenger - Battlefields
 Scorpions - World Wide Live 
 Seduce - Seduce
 Seducer - Caught in the Act
 Shere Khan - Quite Enough for Love
 Sinner - Touch of Sin
 Silver Mountain - Universe
 Slauter Xstroyes - Winter Kill 
 Slaven - Slave To The Heart (EP)
 Slayer - Hell Awaits
 Sodom - In the Sign of Evil (EP)
 Spectre (CA) - Lady of the Night
 Spellbound - Rockin' Reckless
 Stainless Steel (Ger) - Stainless Steel
 Stators - ...Never Too Late
 Steel Angel – ...And the Angels Were Made of Steel
 Steeler (Ger) - Rulin' the Earth
 Steel Vengeance - Call Off the Dogs
 Stormtrooper (US) - Armies of the Night (EP)
 S.O.D. - Speak English or Die
 Stormwind (Ger) - Taken by Storm
 Stormwitch - Tales of Terror 
 Stranger - The Bell
 Stryker (FL) - Stryker
 Stryper - Soldiers Under Command
 Sweethard - Sweethard
 Sweet Pain - Sweet Pain
 Sweet Savage (US) – Sweet Savage (EP)
 Sye - Turn on the Fire 
 Talon - Never Look Back
 Terraplane – Black and White 
 Thor - Only the Strong
 Thor - Live in Detroit (live)
 Thrasher - Burning at the Speed of Light
 Titanic - Then There Was Rock
 Tokyo Blade - Black Hearts & Jaded Spades
 Tobruk (UK) - Wild on the Run
 Touchdown - Tricks of a Trade
 Trance – Victory
 Trilogy (Aus) - Life on Earth
 Tröjan - Chasing the Storm
 Trouble - The Skull
 Trouble (Swe) - Warrior
 Twisted Sister - Come Out and Play
 220 Volt - Mind over Muscle
 Tygers of Pan Tang - The Wreck-Age
 Tyran' Pace - Long Live Metal
 Tyrant (Ger) - Fight for Your Life
 Tyrant (US) - Legions of the Dead
 Tysondog - Shoot to Kill (EP)
 Tytan - Rough Justice
 Tzar (Can) – Players of the Game
 UFO - Misdemeanor
 Universe - Universe 
 Vampyr - Cry Out for Metal
 Vanadium - On Streets of Danger (live)
 Vandenberg - Alibi
 Vectom - Speed Revolution
 Venom - Possessed
 Vicious Rumors - Soldiers of the Night
 Victim (CA) - DMN
 Victory - Victory
 Virgin Steele - Noble Savage
 Vitriol - The Beginning
 Vow Wow - Cyclone
 Vulcain - La dame de fer (EP)
 Vulcain - Desperados
 Vyper - Afraid of the Dark (EP)
 W.A.S.P. - The Last Command
 Wallop - Metallic Alps
 Warchylde - Murder by Decibels
 Warfare - Metal Anarchy
 Warlock -  Hellbound
 Warrant - First Strike (EP)
 Warrant - The Enforcer
 Warrior -  Fighting for the Earth
 Watchtower - Energetic Disassembly Waysted - The Good the Bad the Waysted White Heat – Runnin' for Life White Lion - Fight to Survive Wild Cat - Love Attack Winged Messenger - Guardians of Eternity Witch (OH) - Salem's Rise Wizard - Marlin, Grog, Madman & The Bomb 
 World War III (PA) – World War III Wrathchild (UK) - Trash Queens (comp)
 Xxaron - The Legacy Y&T - Open Fire (live)
 Y&T - Down for the Count Yngwie Malmsteen - Marching Out Zero Nine – White Lines Zoetrope - Amnesty Znowhite - Kick 'Em When They're Down EPDisbandments
 Mercyful Fate (reformed in 1992)
 Van Halen (Roth quits band)

Events
 Living Colour guitarist Vernon Reid cofounds the Black Rock Coalition, a non-profit organization dedicated to promoting the creative freedom and works of black musicians interested in playing rock music.
 Twisted Sister's Dee Snider testifies at The Parents Music Resource Center Senate hearings on rock censorship at Washington D.C. on September 19, 1985.
 David Lee Roth releases his solo debut (EP) Crazy from the Heat in January 1985. With it comes the announcement he has permanently left Van Halen.
 Black Sabbath reunites at Live Aid with Ozzy Osbourne.
 Led Zeppelin reunites at Live Aid with Phil Collins replacing deceased drummer John Bonham.
 Kam Lee leaves Death and Chuck Schuldiner becomes the vocalist.
 Uriah Heep's former lead singer, David Byron dies on February 28, due to alcohol complications.
 Welcome to Venice'' compilation is released, featuring Suicidal Tendencies, Beowulf, and others, showing the growing crossover trend among the Venice Beach hardcore and metal scenes.

1980s in heavy metal music
Metal